Geoffrey or Jeff Wheeler may refer to:
Geoffrey Wheeler (historian) (1897–1990), British soldier and historian
Geoffrey Wheeler (broadcaster) (1930–2013), English broadcaster
Jeff Wheeler, rally racer, see Sno*Drift